The Jefferson County Courthouse in Birmingham, Alabama is the main county courthouse of Jefferson County, Alabama. It is the county's sixth main courthouse building, and the third in Birmingham. The cornerstone was laid in 1929, and the building was completed in 1932. The prior courthouse was demolished in 1937. The new courthouse was added to the National Register of Historic Places in 1982.

History 
It was designed by Chicago architectural firm Holabird & Root, who also designed Soldier Field.

The courthouse's Art Deco design features limestone bas relief panels by sculptor Leo Friedlander depicting local history and the city's industrial influences, and also includes geometric designs resembling swastikas. The lobby interior features large-scale painted murals by John W. Norton contrasting the "Old South" to the "New South."

The courthouse adjoins the Birmingham Public Library on the east side of Linn Park.  It faces across to Birmingham's City Hall, which was completed in 1950. Other public buildings around the park, which serves as a "municipal plaza," include Boutwell Auditorium, the Birmingham Museum of Art and the Birmingham Board of Education Building.

An International style annex, also dressed in limestone, was built in 1963–64.

See also
 Jefferson County Courthouse, in Bessemer, Alabama, the other active county court facility in 2019.  Built in 1919, it is also listed on the National Register, as part of the Downtown Bessemer Historic District.

References

National Register of Historic Places in Birmingham, Alabama
Government buildings completed in 1929
County courthouses in Alabama
Art Deco architecture in Alabama
Courthouses on the National Register of Historic Places in Alabama
Projects by Holabird & Root